The Vimy Memorial Bridge (previously the Strandherd-Armstrong Bridge) is a bridge in Ottawa, Ontario, Canada. Completed in 2014, it crosses the Rideau River, connecting Strandherd Drive in Barrhaven and Earl Armstrong Road in Riverside South. The bridge was the 2015 winner of the Gustav Lindenthal Medal. It is named after the Battle of Vimy Ridge, as suggested by two Royal Canadian Legions in Ottawa.

History
The idea for a bridge in this location was first brought up in 1993 as a road bridge. The location was later revisited as the location for a light rail crossing for the O-Train, but that extension plan was cancelled. In 2010, the city, provincial, and national governments invested equal amounts totalling $48 million in building the bridge. The original contractor hired, ConCreate USL, went into receivership when the project was about 60% complete and the bonding company, GCNA hired a new contractor, formed by former employees of Concreate, now known as Horseshoe Hill Construction, to complete its bonded work. The project was initially expected to be completed in 2012. However, due to the contractor going bankrupt and the city's bonding company refusing to accelerate work, the completion date was delayed. The bridge was then due to be open in September 2014 and was opened earlier than expected on 12 July 2014.

Features 
The bridge has three vehicle lanes, a dedicated bus lane, and a bike lane in each direction. Pedestrian walkways are located on the outside of the bridge on both the north and south side.

Public transit
OC Transpo Routes 74 and 99, which use the bridge's exclusive bus lanes, are a part of the Ottawa bus rapid transit system known as the Transitway. Route 99 operates in both directions from Hurdman station to Barrhaven Centre station at peak hours via the southeastern transitway, serves Riverside South via Spratt Road and connects to the O-Train Line 2 at Greenboro station, which serves as its northeastern terminus in off-peak hours. Route 74, a high frequency rapid transit route, serves Riverview station in the southbound direction and continues northward to Tunney's Pasture station. The new bridge's exclusive bus lanes have improved transit service in Barrhaven and Riverside South.

References

Bridges in Ottawa
Road bridges in Ontario
Bridges completed in 2014
2014 establishments in Ontario